"The Adventure of the Seven Clocks" is a Sherlock Holmes story by Adrian Conan Doyle (the youngest son of Sir Arthur Conan Doyle, the Sherlock Holmes creator) and John Dickson Carr.  The story was published in the 1954 collection The Exploits of Sherlock Holmes. It was first published in Life on 29 December 1952, with illustrations by Adolf Hallman.

Plot 
Holmes is consulted by a young lady, a companion to an older woman, about the eccentric behavior of a young man she has met.  He behaves normally, but becomes a raging maniac whenever he encounters a clock. The young woman personally has seen him smash two clocks and heard from the man's servant of five other incidents.  Holmes must travel to a distant seaport to gather information to resolve a horrible, terrorist scheme and solve the mystery of the aberrant behavior.

References

Seven Clocks
1952 short stories
Sherlock Holmes pastiches
Works originally published in Life (magazine)